Alireza Koushk Jalali (born March 21, 1958), is an Iranian theatre director and playwright. Currently, he resides in Cologne, Germany, where he also made his first German production in 1986.

Translations

German into Persian:
 Burning Patience by Antonio Skarmeta, published in Tehran Namayeshverlag
 The Government Inspector by Gogol
 Some theaters article, published in various theater journals

Plays (as a director)

 Rausländer (1991, Cologne) The title is a pun of the popular German xenophobic slogan “Ausländer raus!” (=foreigners out!)
 The last of the ardent lover
 Monsieur Ibrahim and the Flowers of the Koran (Dortmund)
 Barefoot naked heart in his hand
 Children's Opera
 Monsieur Ibrahim and the Flowers of the Koran (Cologne)
 The God of Carnage

References

External links
 theaterstueckverlag.de
 alijalaly-ensemble.de
 :fa:علیرضا کوشک جلالی

1958 births
Living people
Iranian theatre directors
Iranian dramatists and playwrights